The Juvenile Judge is a 1960 West German drama film directed by Paul Verhoeven and starring Heinz Rühmann, Karin Baal and Lola Müthel.

It was shoat the Tempelhof Studios in Berlin.

Main cast
 Heinz Rühmann as Judge Dr. Ferdinand Bluhme
 Karin Baal as Inge Schumann
 Lola Müthel as Elisabeth Winkler
 Hans Nielsen as District Court President Dr. Otto Schmittler
 Rainer Brandt as Kurt
 Michael Verhoeven as Alfred 'Fred' Kaiser
 Peter Thom as Willi Lenz
 Lore Schulz as Paula Burg
 Monika John as Marie the Maid
 Hans Epskamp as Senate President Dr. Hallmeier
 Erich Fiedler as Hans-Dieter Vogel, the Salesman
 Willi Rose as Judicial Officer
 Gerd Frickhöffer as Businessman Wellmann
 Harry Engel as 'Black Case' Peters

References

Bibliography
 Reimer, Robert C. & Reimer, Carol J. The A to Z of German Cinema. Scarecrow Press, 2010.

External links

1960 films
1960 drama films
1960s legal films
German drama films
West German films
1960s German-language films
Films directed by Paul Verhoeven (Germany)
1960s teen drama films
UFA GmbH films
Films shot at Tempelhof Studios
1960s German films